Ronald Ernest Clements (born 1929) is a British Old Testament scholar. Clements was a fellow of Fitzwilliam College and Lecturer in Old Testament Literature and Theology at the University of Cambridge, before becoming Samuel Davidson Professor of Old Testament at King's College London.

Clements has written commentaries on Jeremiah, Ezekiel and Isaiah. He is an evangelical who practices a "moderate higher criticism", and has been described as "one of the most prolific British writers in the field of Old Testament".

Books
 Prophecy and Covenant, 1965
 God and Temple, 1965
 Abraham and David, 1967
 Exodus (Cambridge Bible Commentary), 1972
 A Century of Old Testament Study, 1976
 Old Testament Theology: A Fresh Approach, 1978
 Isaiah 1–39 (New Century Bible Commentary), 1980
 Wisdom in Theology, 1992
 Deuteronomy (Epworth Commentaries), 2001

Honours
In 1999, a Festschrift was published in his honour. In Search of True Wisdom: Essays in Old Testament Interpretation in Honour of Ronald E. Clements included contributions from John Barton, Walter Brueggemann, Brevard Childs, Rolf Rendtorff, and R. N. Whybray.

In 2013, Clements was awarded the Burkitt Medal by the British Academy 'in recognition of special service to Biblical Studies'.

References

Living people
1929 births
British biblical scholars
Old Testament scholars
Fellows of Fitzwilliam College, Cambridge
Place of birth missing (living people)
Academics of King's College London
People educated at Buckhurst Hill County High School
Bible commentators
Evangelical Anglican biblical scholars
Presidents of the Society for Old Testament Study